Talcott Mountain State Park is a  public recreation area located on Talcott Mountain in the towns of Avon, Bloomfield, and Simsbury, Connecticut. The state park features the Heublein Tower, a  mountaintop lookout. Access to the tower and its associated museum is via a  trail that takes 30 to 40 minutes to walk. The park offers picnicking, views of the surrounding area, and hiking along the Metacomet Trail.

References

External links
Talcott Mountain State Park Connecticut Department of Energy and Environmental Protection
Talcott Mountain State Park Map Connecticut Department of Energy and Environmental Protection

Simsbury, Connecticut
State parks of Connecticut
Parks in Hartford County, Connecticut
Metacomet Ridge, Connecticut
Protected areas established in 1965
1965 establishments in Connecticut